The North American Open 2011 is the men's edition of the 2011 North American Open, which is a PSA World Series event Gold (prize money: $115,000). The event took place at the Westwood Club in Richmond, Virginia in the United States from 20 February to 26 February. Nick Matthew won his second North American Open trophy, beating Ramy Ashour in the final.

Prize money and ranking points
For 2011, the prize purse was $115,000. The prize money and points breakdown is as follows:

Seeds

Draw and results

See also
North American Open
PSA World Series 2011

References

External links
PSA North American Open 2011 website
North American Open official website

North American Open
Men's North American Open
Men's North American Open